Gao Qiu (1076?–1126) was a Chinese politician who lived during the Song dynasty and served in the court of Emperor Huizong. In the classical novel Water Margin, he is fictionalised as one of the primary antagonists and a nemesis of the protagonists, the 108 Heroes of Mount Liang.

Life
Gao Qiu was presumably born around 1076 AD.

According to the Chinese historical text Huizhulu by Wang Mingqing, Gao Qiu was from Kaifeng and his father was Gao Dunfu. He had two brothers and four sons. He was the second child and his name was given by his father.

Career 
Gao Qiu was a servant of the poet and statesman Su Shi (Su Dongpo) before moving on to serve the artist Wang Shen. He was good at writing according to Huizhulu. He met Emperor Huizong in around November 1109 AD. During the reign of Emperor Huizong, he participated in battles under Liu Zhongwu's command and followed Lin Shu on a diplomatic mission to the Khitan-led Liao dynasty. As Emperor Huizong highly favoured him, he rose through the ranks quickly and became Grand Marshal in 1117 AD, only 8 years after Emperor Huizong ascended the throne. The reason why Gao Qiu could get favoured Emperor Huizong was that he was good at Cuju. Emperor Huizong liked Cuju and was very pleased with Gao Qiu's literary and artistic talents. But there is also a guess that Gao Qiu had made great contributions to Emperor Huizong's throne.

After Gao Qiu succeeded in his career, he made a lot of fame and money for his own family and also framed people who made him upset unscrupulously. He recommended the son of his old superior Liu Zhongwu to Emperor Huizong, who later became a famous general. He also took great care of Su Shi's disciples with financial aid and respect.

After Emperor Huizong's abdication on 18 January 1126, Gao Qiu's influence in the Song imperial court decreased and he died of illness in 1126. After his death, he was removed from office for corrupting the army and government.

Comments on Gao Qiu in reality 
Gao Qiu not only relied on good Cuju to be favored, but also his artistic interest and lifestyle that attracted Emperor Huizong very much. Therefore, in fact their relationship had exceeded the relationship between general monarch and minister, to the relationship of good friends. This should be the reason why he was favoured for over 25 years.

Gao Qiu was not as ungrateful as recorded in the novel Water Margin, but a person who was considerate in return. He took care of Su Shi's disciples when they were severely suppressed by Emperor Huizong. Liu Zhongwu was once Gao Qiu's superior and helped him get promoted. After Gao Qiu became Grand Marshal, he recommended the son of Liu Zhongwu, Liu Qi, who later became a famous general against Jin. From these two things we can see what kind of person Gao Qiu was.

Gao Qiu's depictions in fiction 
In Water Marigin, Gao Qiu is one of the chief villains of the classical novel Water Margin. Gao Qiu, who was a street punk, was even kicked out of the house by his father. Because of his good "Cuju" skills, he was appreciated by Emperor Huizong, who loved "Cuju" very much. Later, when Emperor Huizong enthroned to become the Emperor of the country, Gao Qiu made rapid advances in one's career, and was soon promoted to Grand Marshal, which was the highest official in charge of military affairs in ancient China. Once such a person is in power, he will act indiscriminately. Disregarding the original intentions of Liangshan heroes to "serve the country with all their loyalty" and "contribute to the country", he colluded with traitors and ganged up to encircle Liangshan and destroy the court to recruit peace. Gao Qiu set up a false accusation against Lin Chong who was a role of justice in Water Margin so that Lin Chong was sent to Changzhou, which was a remote wilderness, because his adopted son Gao Yanei had a crush on Lin Chong's wife. He then sent Lu Qian to kill Lin Chong, but Lu Qian was finally killed by Lin Chong.  The incident drove Lin Chong to revolt and go up to Liangshan where righteous characters in Water Margin gathered. After Liangshan  grew stronger and stronger, Gao Qiu led a crusade against Liangshan and wanted to eradicate the people on Liangshan. However, he was captured alive. After Song Jiang, who was the chief of the righteous characters in the Water Margin, is summoned to settle the rebellion for the government, Gao Qiu still suspects the people of Liangshan and kills Lu Junyi and Song Jiang with poisoned wine.  Ruan Xiaoqi was also deprived of office by Gao Qiu's henchmen and demoted to a civilian.

The famous critic Jin Shengtan once claimed that: "Before writing about 180 people in Water Margin, the writer first writes about Gao Qiu. You can see that there are problems in the government." Yes, after Gao Qiu was no longer in power, the same group of people, with the help of Grand Marshal Su, another upright Grand Marshal, became the backbone of the court again. The social reality that officials forced the people to rebel has once again been proved.

In Dangkouzhi, a Chinese historical novel，Gao Qiu colluded with Cai Jing, another traitor in Water Margin, to frame Liangshan, but was killed by Lei Heng and Zhu Tong. Zhu Tong gave his head to Lin Chong and wanted to cure him, but Lin Chong was mad at his head.

See also
 List of Water Margin characters

References

 
 
 
 

Year of birth unknown
1126 deaths
Politicians from Kaifeng
Song dynasty politicians from Henan
Year of birth uncertain